Grgo Ilić, also Grgo Ilijić (Gregorius; Higlich, Hilijić-Ilijić, Hilijić-Varešanin, Hiljich de Vares, Varešanin, Ilijić-Varešanin, Zečević), also known as fra Grgo Varešanin (18 October 1736 – 1 March 1813), was Bosnian catholic bishop and Franciscan friar. He was born in Vareš, present-day Bosnia and Herzegovina, at the time part of the Ottoman Empire. He served as a provincial of the Franciscan Province of Bosnia for two terms.and as the Apostolic Vicar of Bosnia for life.

Biography 
Grgo Ilijić was born in Vareš, Ottoman Empire (central part of modern-day Bosnia and Herzegovina). In 1752 he entered the seminary at the Franciscan friary, Kraljeva Sutjeska, and then went to study philosophy and theology in Italy. He returned to Kraljeva Sutjeska to teach novice friars, and became friary guardian. He also served as parish priest in several (parishes) until 1774.
He served as a provincial of the Franciscan Province of Bosnia for two terms. Pope Pius VI appointed Ilijić to the position of provincial first in 1783, a position he held only for one year from opposition within the provincial electoral plenary council, and than in 1793 for a second term, this time for life. In 1796, Ilijić was named Titular Bishop of Ruspe and coadjutor apostolic vicar to Augustin Botoš-Okić. In 1798, Ilijić became the apostolic vicar of Bosnia, a service he performed for the rest of his life.

Work influences and impact 
As a bishop, Ilijić wrote and printed many pastoral-catechist works. In Filip Lastrić's work Od’ uzame (Mleci, 1796) he published 14 of its speeches aimed at Bosnian common people: Kratko nadometnuće u’ knjižice Od’ uzame O. fra Filipa iz Oćevje. Tojest XIV. razlikî, ravnî, i kratkî, govorenjah za pùk priprostiti bosanski, a u Cvitu razlika mirisa duhovnoga (Mleci 1802); T. Babića svoja Četeri govorenja ćudoredna. He wrote and printed many of his letters, circulars, and speeches:  (Padova 1800); Način pribogoljubni za štovati prisveto uznesenje Marijino na nebo (Dubrovnik 1799). An important contribution to Bosnian translation is a collection of speeches of archbishop Alessandro Borgia, with whom Ilijić closely associated and printed it in Dubrovnik in 1799 under the title .

See also
Religion in Bosnia and Herzegovina

References

External links
Catholic Church in Bosnia-Herzegovina, encyclopedia.com

1736 births
1813 deaths
People from Vareš
Franciscans of the Franciscan Province of Bosnia
Franciscan bishops
18th-century Roman Catholic titular bishops
19th-century Roman Catholic titular bishops
Apostolic vicars
Bishops appointed by Pope Pius VI
Christian clergy from the Ottoman Empire
Bosnia and Herzegovina writers
Bosnia and Herzegovina Roman Catholic bishops
18th-century Bosnia and Herzegovina Roman Catholic bishops